Speranskia is a plant genus of the family Euphorbiaceae first described in 1858. It is the only genus of the subtribe Speranskiinae. The entire genus is endemic to China.

Species
 Speranskia cantonensis (Hance) Pax & K.Hoffm. - Hubei, Guangdong
 Speranskia tuberculata (Bunge) Baill. - Anhui, Gansu, Hebei, Henan, Jilin, Liaoning, Nei Mongol, Ningxia, Shaanxi, Shandong, Shanxi, Sichuan
 Speranskia yunnanensis S.M.Hwang - Yunnan

References

Euphorbiaceae genera
Chrozophoreae
Endemic flora of China
Taxa named by Henri Ernest Baillon